Claude Hayslett (August 2, 1912 – February 15, 1978), nicknamed "Tupelo Tornado", was an American Negro league pitcher between 1937 and 1941.

A native of Fayette County, Tennessee, Hayslett made his Negro leagues debut in 1937 with the Indianapolis Athletics and Memphis Red Sox. He played for Memphis again the following season, then spent 1939 with the Indianapolis ABCs, and finished his career in 1941 with the New York Black Yankees. Hayslett died in Memphis, Tennessee in 1978 at age 65.

References

External links
 and Seamheads

1912 births
1978 deaths
Indianapolis Athletics players
Memphis Red Sox players
New York Black Yankees players
Baseball pitchers
Baseball players from Tennessee
People from Fayette County, Tennessee
20th-century African-American sportspeople